Shivram Rango Rane (born 1901 in Vivra village (Bk.), District Jalgaon, Bombay State; died 1970) was a politician from Bombay State. He studied at Amalner, Jalgaon and Poona and practised at the Bar during 1930–52. He was a member and secretary of the Kandesh College Education Society, Jalgaon. He was a member of the Bombay Legislative Assembly during 1947–51.

He was member of 1st Lok Sabha from Bhusaval (Lok Sabha constituency). He was elected to 2nd, 3rd and 4th Lok Sabha from Buldhana (Lok Sabha constituency). He was the Deputy Chief Whip of the Congress Party during 1957–66.

He married Rambhabai and has 3 sons and 3 daughters.

References

1901 births
1970 deaths
India MPs 1952–1957
People from Bhusawal
India MPs 1957–1962
People from Buldhana district
India MPs 1962–1967
India MPs 1967–1970
People from Jalgaon district